Gnaeus Cornelius Scipio Hispanus of the Scipiones branch of the gens Cornelia, was a Roman politician.

Gnaeus Cornelius Scipio Hispanus was the son of Gnaeus Cornelius Scipio Hispallus. He was one of the decemviri stlitibus judicandis and military tribune before 150 BC, and became quaestor around that date. He then became aedile, probably in 141 BC. He was a praetor in 139 BC. As praetor, he expelled the astrologers (Chaldaeans and Jews) from the city of Rome.

Sources 
 Valerius Maximus 1,3,3

Bibliography 
 Karl-Ludwig Elvers: [I 79] C. Scipio Hispanus, Cn.. In: Der Neue Pauly. vol. 3 (1997), col. 184.

Ancient Roman politicians
Cornelii Scipiones
Roman patricians
Year of death unknown
Year of birth unknown
2nd-century BC Romans